Tomaž Avbelj (born 26 August 1991) is a football midfielder from Slovenia who plays for Austrian club ASKÖ Wölfnitz.

References

External links

PrvaLiga profile 
Tomaž Avbelj at Fussball Österreich

1991 births
Living people
Slovenian footballers
Slovenian expatriate footballers
Association football midfielders
NK Olimpija Ljubljana (2005) players
NK Ivančna Gorica players
NK Radomlje players
NK Dob players
Slovenian Second League players
Slovenian PrvaLiga players
Slovenian expatriate sportspeople in Austria
Expatriate footballers in Austria